Joseph A. "Doc" Alexander (April 1, 1897 – September 12, 1975) was an American football player, who played center, tackle, guard, and end, and coach in the National Football League.

Alexander was born in Silver Creek, New York, the son of Russian immigrants, and was Jewish. He attended Syracuse University, and played for the school football team—twice being named All American at guard—as he attained a medical degree.  He was inducted to the College Football Hall of Fame in 1954, and also into the International Jewish Sports Hall of Fame.

Alexander played for the Syracuse Pros (1921), and played professionally in the National Football League (NFL) for the Rochester Jeffersons (1921–24) and the New York Giants (1925–27). He was a two-time First-team All-Pro, in both 1921 and 1922. In 1922 he was the head coach of the Jeffersons, and in 1926 he was the head coach of the Giants.

Head coaching record

College

NFL

See also
 List of select Jewish football players

References

External links
 Just Sports Stats

1897 births
1975 deaths
American football guards
American people of Russian-Jewish descent
CCNY Beavers football coaches
New York Giants head coaches
New York Giants players
Rochester Jeffersons coaches
Rochester Jeffersons players
Syracuse Orange football players
Syracuse Pros players
All-American college football players
College Football Hall of Fame inductees
International Jewish Sports Hall of Fame inductees
People from Silver Creek, New York
Players of American football from New York (state)
Jewish American sportspeople
20th-century American Jews